Pheta (Nepali: फेटा) is a rural municipality in Bara District in Province No. 2 of Nepal. It was formed in 2016 occupying current 7 sections (wards) from previous 7 former VDCs. It occupies an area of 23.65 km2 with a total population of 26,722.

References

Populated places in Bara District
Rural municipalities of Nepal established in 2017
Rural municipalities in Madhesh Province